The 2022–23 Norwegian Handball Cup was the 56th edition of the national women's handball cup tournament. Vipers Kristiansand defended their title after winning the final against Sola HK.

If a game ends with a draw after the regular time, it will proceed to two 5-minutes periods of extra time. If there is still a draw, another 2 × 5-minutes extra time will be played. If the scores are still level after two extra times, the winner is decided by a 7-meter shootout.

Round and draw dates
The schedule of the competition will be as follows (all draws are held at the NHF headquarters in Oslo, Norway).

In April 2022 the Norwegian Handball Federation announced  that for the first time in the competition's history, the winner of the Norwegian Handball Cup would be decided in a final four tournament called Final8. Final8 will be a tournament where both the women's and men's champion will be elected, as well as the junior champions. The event will take place at the Sparebanken Sør Amfi in Arendal, Norway on February 24–26, 2022.

Knockout phase

Round 1
The first round were scheduled to be played before August 17, 2022.

|-

|-

|-

|-

|-

|-

|-
|}

Round 2
The second round were scheduled to be played before August 31, 2022.

|-

|-

|-

|-

|-

|-

|-

|-

|-

|-

|-

|-

|-

|-

|-

|-

|-

|-

|-

|-

|-

|-

|-

|-

|-

|-

|-

|-

|-
|}

Round 3
The third round were scheduled to be played before September 21, 2022.

|-

|-

|-

|-

|-

|-

|-

|-

|-

|-

|-

|-

|-

|-

|-
|}

1/8-finals
The fourth round were scheduled to be played before October 19, 2022.

|-

|-

|-

|-

|-

|-

|-

|-

|-
|}

Quarterfinals
The fifth round is scheduled to be played on December 7, 2022.

|-

|-

|-

|-
|}

Final four

Bracket

Semifinals

Final

References

Women's handball in Norway
Norwegian Cup
Norwegian Cup
Norwegian Cup